Captain Silas Talbot (January 11, 1751June 30, 1813) was an American military officer and slave trader. He served in the Continental Army and Continental Navy during the American Revolutionary War, and is most famous for commanding  from 1799 to 1801. Talbot was a member of the Society of the Cincinnati's branch in New York.

Early life

Talbot was born in Dighton, Massachusetts on January 11, 1751 and came from a large, farming family. He first took to seafaring at the age of twelve serving as cabin boy in a coasting vessel. Talbot's performance proved to be outstanding and by 1772 had saved up enough money to buy property on Weybosset Street in Providence, Rhode Island, and build a stone home, having learned the trade of stone masonry earlier in life. He owned slaves.

Military service

American Revolutionary War
On June 28, 1775, Talbot received the commission of a captain in the 2nd Rhode Island Regiment.  After participating in the siege of Boston, Talbot and the Continental Army began their march to New York.  En route, they stopped at New London, Connecticut whose port had just received Esek Hopkins who had just landed from a naval expedition to the Bahamas. After learning that Hopkins was going to petition General Washington for 200 volunteers needed to assist his squadron in reaching Providence, Talbot volunteered his services in this effort.

After Talbot made his way back to New York where he was aiding in the transportation of troops, he obtained command of a fire ship and attempted to use it to set fire to the Royal Navy warship HMS Asia on September 14, 1776.  The attempt failed, but the daring it displayed, and that Talbot was severely burned during the effort, won him a promotion to major on October 10, 1777, retroactive to September 1.

After suffering a severe wound at Fort Mifflin, while fighting to defend Philadelphia, on October 23, 1777, Talbot returned to active service in the summer of 1778 and fought the Battle of Rhode Island on August 28, 1778.

As commander of the galley  (which he had captured from the Royal Navy in the Sakonnet River on October 28, 1778), and later , both under the Army, he cruised against Loyalist vessels that were harassing American trade between Long Island and Nantucket and made prisoners of many of them.  On November 14, 1778, the Continental Congress passed a resolution that recognized his success in capturing Pigot and promoted him to lieutenant colonel on the same date.  In October of the same year, the Rhode Island General Assembly voted to present Talbot with a "genteel silver-hilted sword" for the same action.  The sword was made by silversmith John Gladding Gibbs of Providence.

Continental Navy
Because of his success fighting afloat for the Army, Congress commissioned Talbot as a captain in the Continental Navy on September 17, 1779. However, since Congress had no suitable warship to entrust to him, Talbot put to sea in command of the privateer General Washington. In it, he took one prize, but soon thereafter ran into a Royal Navy fleet off New York. After a chase, he struck his colors to Culloden, a 74-gun British ship-of-the-line and remained a prisoner of war until exchanged for a British officer in December 1781.

Slave trader

Talbot was not only a slaveholder, but from 1783 onwards was the partial owner of two slave ships, the sloop Peggy and ninety-ton brigantine Industry. Both vessels transported slaves from the Guinea region to Charleston. On one 1786 voyage of the Industry, Talbot was notified by his solicitors Murray, Mumford and Bower on 9 September 1786 of a large financial loss: "we hear about one hundred & eighty Slaves off the coast of Guinea, near half of which died before the brig arrived in Charleston where she is now." As late 1801 Talbot was still trying collect some compensation from his business partners to offset his financial losses from the slave trade.

Postwar
After the war, Talbot settled in Johnstown, New York, the county seat of Fulton County, where he purchased the former manor house and estate of Sir William Johnson, founder of Johnstown. He was a member of the New York State Assembly in 1792 and 1792 to 1793.

Congress and United States Navy
In January 1793, Talbot was elected as a Federalist from New York to the 3rd United States Congress, and served from March 4, 1793, to approximately June 5, 1794, when President George Washington chose him third in a list of six captains of the newly established United States Navy. He was ordered to superintend the construction of the frigate  at New York.  On April 20, 1796, construction of President was suspended and Talbot was discharged from the Navy.

With the outbreak of the Quasi-War with France, Talbot was re-commissioned as a captain in the United States Navy on May 11, 1798. He commanded the Santo Domingo Station in 1799 and 1800 and was commended by the Secretary of the Navy for protecting American commerce and for laying the foundation of a permanent trade with that country. It is said that Talbot was wounded 13 times and carried 5 bullets in his body.

Captain Talbot resigned from the Navy on September 21, 1801, and died in New York City on June 30, 1813.  He was buried in Trinity Churchyard in lower Manhattan.

Legacy and honors
The first  (Torpedo Boat No. 15) was named for Lt. John Gunnell Talbot, no relation to Silas Talbot; the second and third Talbots (Talbot (DD-114/APD 7) and Talbot (DEG/FFG-4), respectively) were named for Captain Silas Talbot.

Talbot was an original member of the Rhode Island Society of the Cincinnati.

Battery Talbot (1899-1919), named for Silas Talbot in G.O. 30, March 19, 1902, was a reinforced concrete, Endicott Period 4.72 inch coastal gun battery on Fort Adams, Newport County, Rhode Island.  Both of the original guns from this battery survive.  One is on display at Equality Park in Newport and the other is at Fort Moultrie National Park near Charleston, South Carolina.

There is a cenotaph in honor of Captain Talbot in the Dighton Congregational Church cemetery in his hometown of Dighton, Massachusetts.

See also
 John Paul Jones
 Thomas Truxtun
 Bibliography of early American naval history

References

Bibliography

External links
 Biographic sketch at U.S. Congress website
 Mystic Seaport: biography of Silas Talbot
 Letter from Silas Talbot to George Washington

1751 births
1813 deaths
People from Dighton, Massachusetts
People of colonial Massachusetts
Pro-Administration Party members of the United States House of Representatives from New York (state)
Members of the New York State Assembly
American slave owners
American slave traders
Continental Army officers from Rhode Island
Continental Navy officers
Commanders of the USS Constitution
People of Massachusetts in the American Revolution
People of the Quasi-War